Gola  Gokrannath Assembly constituency is one of the 403 constituencies of the Uttar Pradesh Legislative Assembly, India. It is a part of the Lakhimpur district and one of the five assembly constituencies in  the Kheri Lok Sabha constituency. The first election in this assembly  constituency was held in 2012 after the "Delimitation of Parliamentary  and Assembly Constituencies Order, 2008" was passed and the constituency  was formed in 2008. The constituency is assigned identification number 139.

Wards  / Areas
The extent of Gola Gokrannath Assembly constituency is KCs Aliganj, Haiderabad, Daudpur,  Gola Gokarannath MB & Mailani NP of Gola Gokrannath Tehsil.

Members of the Legislative Assembly 

^ bypoll

Election results

2022 by polls

2022

2017
17th Vidhan Sabha: 2017 General  Elections

16th Vidhan Sabha: 2012 General  Elections

See also

Kheri Lok Sabha constituency
Lakhimpur Kheri district
Sixteenth Legislative Assembly of Uttar Pradesh
Uttar Pradesh Legislative Assembly
Vidhan Bhawan

References

External links
 

Assembly constituencies of Uttar Pradesh
Politics of Lakhimpur Kheri district
Constituencies established in 2008